The BMW M51 is an inline-6 cylinder Diesel engine produced by the Upper Austrian BMW plant in Steyr from July 1991 through February 2000. Its predecessor is the BMW M21, the successor is the BMW M57.

Description 

The M51 is a water-cooled and turbocharged inline six-cylinder diesel engine with a Bosch VP20-swirl-chamber-injection.

Some engine variants have an intercooler in addition to the turbocharger, they can be identified by the tds. The M51 is an engine made of cast iron, it has one chain driven overhead camshaft and two valves per cylinder. Compared to the M21 the M51 now has tappets and a hydraulic valve lash adjustment. The fuel injection in the first engines is controlled by the ECU Bosch DDE 2.1, which was replaced after the first technical revision by the DDE 2.2. This results in greater torque at lower revs. For lubrication SAE 5W-40 oil is used.

Applications:
 1991 - 1996 E36 325td (M51D25 UL)
 1996 - 1998 E36 325td (M51D25TÜ UL)
 1993 - 1996 E36 325tds (M51D25 OL)
 1996 - 1998 E36 325tds (M51D25TÜ OL)
 1992 - 1996 E34 525td (M51D25 UL)
 1991 - 1996 E34 525tds (M51D25 OL)
 1996 - 2000 E39 525tds (M51D25TÜ OL)
 1996 - 2000 E39 525td (M51D25TÜ UL)
 1996 - 2000 E38 725tds (M51D25TÜ OL)
 1995 - 2001 Land Rover Range Rover 2.5 D/DSE
 1995 - 2001 Opel Omega
 1992 UMM Alter II (single example; engine, gearbox, and electronics were fitted by BMW in Munich)

See also
 List of BMW engines

References 

 

M51
1991 introductions
Diesel engines by model
Straight-six engines